Hod Lipson (born 1967) is an Israeli - American robotics engineer. He is the director of Columbia University's Creative Machines Lab. Lipson's work focuses on evolutionary robotics, design automation, rapid prototyping, artificial life, and creating machines that can demonstrate some aspects of human creativity. His publications have been cited more than 26,000 times, and he has an h-index of 73, . Lipson is interviewed in the 2018 documentary on artificial intelligence Do You Trust This Computer?

Biography
Lipson received B.Sc. (1989) and Ph.D. (1998) degrees in Mechanical Engineering from Technion Israel Institute of Technology. Before joining the faculty of Columbia University in 2015, he was a professor at Cornell University for 14 years. Prior to Cornell, he was an assistant professor in the Computer Science Department at Brandeis University's, and a postdoctoral researcher at MIT's Mechanical Engineering Department.

Research
Lipson has been involved with machine learning and presented his "self-aware" robot at the 2007 TED conference.

Beginning in 2009, he and his Cornell University graduate student Michael Schmidt developed a software named Eureqa capable of deriving equations, mathematical relationships and laws of nature from sets of data: for instance, deriving Newton's second law of motion from a data set of positions and velocities of a double pendulum.  In 2011, it was reported that Eureqa had succeeded at a much more complex task: re-deriving seven equations describing how levels of various chemical compounds fluctuate in oxygen-deprived yeast cells.

In research on robotic self-awareness he advocates "self-simulation" as preliminary stage.

Lipson has been involved with teams that have created a number of machines including:
 Fab@Home fabbers—low cost "3-d printers"
 Self replicating robots—simple structures capable of reproducing themselves given the appropriate parts.
 "Self Aware Robots"—machines capable of compensating for damage that would otherwise impede movement.
 Molecubes self-reproducing robots.

References

External links
 Columbia Creative Machines Lab homepage
 
  (TED2007)
 [ Live broadcast of Hod Lipson on The Agenda with Steve Paikin discussion panel, "Robotics Revolution and the Future of Evolution"] with Cory Doctorow, Michael Belfiore, and Eliezer Yudkowsky at the Quantum to Cosmos festival.

1967 births
Living people
American roboticists
Cornell University faculty
Columbia School of Engineering and Applied Science faculty
People from Haifa
Researchers of artificial life